Epitrix fasciata, the banded epitrix, is a species of flea beetle in the family Chrysomelidae. It is found in the Caribbean, Central America, North America, Oceania, and South America.

References

Further reading

External links

 

Alticini
Articles created by Qbugbot
Beetles described in 1918